LigandScout is computer software that allows creating three-dimensional (3D) pharmacophore models from structural data of macromolecule–ligand complexes, or from training and test sets of organic molecules. It incorporates a complete definition of 3D chemical features (such as hydrogen bond donors, acceptors, lipophilic areas, positively and negatively ionizable chemical groups) that describe the interaction of a bound small organic molecule (ligand) and the surrounding binding site of the macromolecule. These pharmacophores can be overlaid and superimposed using a pattern-matching based alignment algorithm that is solely based on pharmacophoric feature points instead of chemical structure. From such an overlay, shared features can be interpolated to create a so-called shared-feature pharmacophore that shares all common interactions of several binding sites/ligands or extended to create a so-called merged-feature pharmacophore. The software has been successfully used to predict new lead structures in drug design, e.g., predicting biological activity of novel human immunodeficiency virus (HIV) reverse transcriptase inhibitors.

Similar tools
Other software tools which help to model pharmacophores include:
Molecular Operating Environment] (MOE) – by the Chemical Computing Group
Phase – by Schrödinger
Discovery Studio – by Accelrys
SYBYL-X – by Tripos
Pharao by Silicos-It

See also
Comparison of software for molecular mechanics modeling

References

Further reading
 

Medicinal chemistry
Molecular modelling software